Vriesea paraibica is a species of flowering plant in the genus Vriesea. This bromeliad is endemic to the Atlantic Forest biome (Mata Atlantica Brasileira), located in southeastern Brazil.

References

paraibica
Endemic flora of Brazil
Flora of the Atlantic Forest